Maria Kirilenko and Nadia Petrova were the defending champions, but Kirilenko chose not to compete this year.
Petrova teamed with Katarina Srebotnik and successfully defended the title, defeating Lisa Raymond and Laura Robson in the final 6–1, 7–6(7–2).

Seeds

Draw

Finals

Top half

Bottom half

References 
 Main Draw

Sony Open Tennis - Women's Doubles
Women's Doubles
Women in Florida